This is a list of the operas of the Austrian composer Giuseppe Bonno, also known  as Josef or Josephus Johannes Baptizta Bon, (1711–1788).

List

References
Notes

Sources
Angermüller, Rudolph (1992), 'Bonno, Giuseppe' in The New Grove Dictionary of Opera, ed. Stanley Sadie (London) 

Lists of operas by composer
Lists of compositions by composer